Jacques Cardyn (born 4 May 1946) is a Canadian fencer. He competed in the team épée event at the 1984 Summer Olympics.

In 2011 Cardyn was the Chef de Mission of the Canadian team at the 2011 Pan American Games in Guadalajara, Mexico.

References

External links
 

1946 births
Living people
People from General Carrera Province
Canadian male fencers
Olympic fencers of Canada
Fencers at the 1984 Summer Olympics
Pan American Games medalists in fencing
Fencers at the 1983 Pan American Games
Medalists at the 1983 Pan American Games
Pan American Games gold medalists for Canada